Richard Francis Wyands (July 2, 1928 – September 25, 2019) was an American jazz pianist, composer, and arranger, best known for his work as a side-man.

Early life
Wyands was born in Oakland, California, on July 2, 1928 and grew up in Berkeley. He began playing the piano at age 7 or 8 and started playing professionally in 1944, while a teenager, in San Francisco. Wyands earned a degree in music from San Francisco State College in 1950. At school and college he played piano and drums. Wyands was influenced by Count Basie, Nat King Cole, Erroll Garner, Art Tatum, and Teddy Wilson.

Later life and career
In the early 1950s, Wyands was part of Vernon Alley's group that was the house band at the Black Hawk club in San Francisco, and thus part of the rhythm section that accompanied visiting soloists. The year after leaving the Black Hawk in 1954, Wyands was an intermission performer at another San Francisco club, before becoming music director for vocalist Ella Fitzgerald during a 3-month period in 1956.

For ten months around 1957, he was accompanist to pop singers in a club in Ottawa, Canada. Following this, he toured with vocalist Carmen McRae for three months, and arrived in New York with her in 1958. In New York, he played with Roy Haynes, Charles Mingus (1959), Jerome Richardson (1959), and Gigi Gryce. In the 1960s Wyands was a member of Illinois Jacquet's band. Wyands worked with guitarist Kenny Burrell from 1965 to 1974.

Wyands died on September 25, 2019, in New York.

Discography

As leader
Then, Here and Now (Storyville, 1978)
The Arrival (DIW-611, 1992)
Reunited (CrissCross 1105, 1995)
Get Out of Town (Steeplechase SCCD 31401, 1996)
Half and Half (CrissCross 1185,1999)
As Long as There's Music (Savant SCD 2031, 2000)
Lady of the Lavender Mist (Venus TKCV 35038, 2002)

As sideman
With Gene Ammons
Nice an' Cool (Moodsville, 1961)
Jug (Prestige, 1961)
Soul Summit Vol. 2 (Prestige, 1961 [1962])
Late Hour Special (Prestige, 1961 [1964])
Velvet Soul (Prestige, 1961 [1964])
With Kenny Burrell
The Tender Gender (Cadet, 1966)
A Generation Ago Today (Verve, 1967)
Night Song (Verve, 1969)
God Bless the Child (CTI, 1971)
'Round Midnight (Fantasy, 1972)
Up the Street, 'Round the Corner, Down the Block (Fantasy, 1974)
Stormy Monday (Fantasy, 1974 [1978])
Prime: Live at the Downtown Room (HighNote, 1976 [2009])
With Benny Carter
Over the Rainbow (MusicMasters, 1989)
Cookin' at Carlos I (MusicMasters 1988 [1990])
With Eddie "Lockjaw" Davis
Trane Whistle (Prestige, 1960)
With Teddy Edwards
Horn to Horn (Muse, 1994 [1996]) with Houston Person
Midnight Creeper (HighNote, 1997)
Smooth Sailing (HighNote, 2001 [2003])
With Frank Foster
Manhattan Fever (Blue Note, 1968)
With Gigi Gryce
Saying Somethin'! (New Jazz, 1960)
The Hap'nin's (New Jazz, 1960)
The Rat Race Blues (New Jazz, 1960)
Reminiscin' (Mercury, 1960)
Doin' the Gigi (Uptown, 2011)
With Roy Haynes
Just Us (New Jazz, 1960)
With Freddie Hubbard
First Light (CTI, 1971)
With Willis Jackson
Really Groovin' (Prestige, 1961)
In My Solitude (Moodsville, 1961)
With Etta Jones
Don't Go to Strangers (Prestige, 1960)
Something Nice (Prestige, 1961)
Easy Living (HighNote, 2000)
Etta Jones Sings Lady Day (HighNote, 2001)
With Roland Kirk
We Free Kings (Mercury, 1961)
With Charles Mingus
Jazz Portraits: Mingus in Wonderland (United Artists, 1959)
With Oliver Nelson
Screamin' the Blues (New Jazz NJ8243, 1960)
Straight Ahead (Prestige, 1961)
With Houston Person
Person-ified (HighNote, 1997)
My Romance (HighNote, 1998)
Soft Lights (HighNote, 1999)
Blue Velvet (HighNote, 2001)
Sentimental Journey (HighNote, 2002)
With Jerome Richardson
Roamin' with Richardson (New Jazz, 1959)
With James Spaulding
The Smile of the Snake (HighNote, 1997)
With Buddy Tate and Al Grey
Just Jazz (Uptown, 1984)
With Cal Tjader
Cal Tjader: Vibist (Savoy, 1954)
Ritmo Caliente (Fantasy, 1954)
With Warren Vaché
Horn of Plenty (Muse, 1994)
Talk to Me Baby (Muse, 1996)
With Richard Williams
New Horn in Town (Candid, 1960)
With Lem Winchester
Lem Winchester with Feeling (Moodsville, 1961)
With Bobby Kapp, Gene Perla
Fine Wine Trio (Fine Wine Records, 2000)

References

External links
BBC Radio 2
[ AllMusic]

1928 births
2019 deaths
Hard bop pianists
Post-bop pianists
Musicians from Oakland, California
American jazz pianists
American male pianists
20th-century American pianists
Jazz musicians from California
21st-century American pianists
20th-century American male musicians
21st-century American male musicians
American male jazz musicians
Criss Cross Jazz artists
SteepleChase Records artists